General Mohd Ghazali bin Che Mat (17 December 1930 – 7 July 2021) is a former Chief of Malaysian army and Chief of Defence Forces.

Death
Mohd Ghazali died at Tunku Mizan Armed Forces Hospital in Wangsa Maju at the age 90.

Honours
 :
 Recipient of the Star of the Commander of Valour (PGB) (1958)
 :
 Recipient of the Malaysian Commemorative Medal (Bronze) (PPM) (1965)
 Companion of the Order of Loyalty to the Crown of Malaysia (JSM) (1971)
 Commander of the Order of Loyalty to the Crown of Malaysia (PSM) – Tan Sri (1985)
 Commander of the Order of the Defender of the Realm (PMN) – Tan Sri (1987)
 :
 Member of the Order of Kinabalu (ADK) (1968)

 Knight Commander of the Order of the Crown of Johor (DPMJ) – Dato'
 Knight Grand Commander of the Order of the Crown of Johor (SPMJ) – Dato' (1986)

 Knight Commander of the Order of Taming Sari (DPTS) – Dato' Pahlawan (1978)
 Knight Grand Commander of the Order of Taming Sari (SPTS) – Dato' Seri Panglima (1986)

References 

1930 births
2021 deaths
Recipients of the Star of the Commander of Valour
Companions of the Order of Loyalty to the Crown of Malaysia
Commanders of the Order of Loyalty to the Crown of Malaysia
Commanders of the Order of the Defender of the Realm
Knights Commander of the Order of the Crown of Johor
Knights Grand Commander of the Order of the Crown of Johor
Malaysian Army personnel
Pakistan Command and Staff College alumni